Rury is one of the quarters of the city of Lublin, Poland located in the west-central part of the city. The district grew upon the hillside, former city fields, extending to Konopnica. From February 23, 2006 the district became an administrative region of Lublin.

History

During the German occupation of Poland (World War II), in 1940, the Germans murdered about 500 Poles from the region in several massacres in the settlement of Rury Jezuickie, now located within the district. Among the victims were activists, students, doctors, engineers, local officials, judges, lawyers, military officers, members of the Sejm (Polish parliament), etc. There is a memorial at the site.

References

Lublin
Neighbourhoods in Poland
Nazi war crimes in Poland